Jessica Draskau Petersson (born 8 September 1977) is a Danish long-distance runner . Her fastest marathon time was set at the 2015 Bank of America Chicago marathon, where she ran a time of 2:30:07. She competed in the marathon at the 2012 Summer Olympics and 2016 Olympic Marathon in Rio She finished eighth in the marathon at the 2014 European Athletics Championships.

References

1977 births
Living people
Alumni of the University of East Anglia
Danish female long-distance runners
Danish female marathon runners
Olympic athletes of Denmark
Athletes (track and field) at the 2012 Summer Olympics
Athletes (track and field) at the 2016 Summer Olympics
People from Gentofte Municipality
British female marathon runners
University of Idaho alumni
University of Waikato alumni
Olympic female marathon runners
Sportspeople from the Capital Region of Denmark